Ocampo is a municipality located in the Mexican state of Tamaulipas.

See also
Ocampo, Tamaulipas
Municipalities of Tamaulipas

External links
Gobierno Municipal de Ocampo Official website

Municipalities of Tamaulipas